Joel R. Carter Jr. (born August 8, 1978) is an American politician and real estate broker who has served in the Mississippi State Senate from the 49th district since 2018.

Early life and education 
Carter was born in Jackson, Mississippi, and attended Gulfport High School. After graduating, he enrolled at the University of Southern Mississippi at its main campus in Hattiesburg.

Career 
Carter chairs the Mississippi Senate Energy Committee and is a member of the Corrections, Finance, Highways, and Transportation, Investigate State Offices, Labor, Ports and Marine Resources, and Tourism Senate Committees. He is a Republican. As a member of the state senate, he has pushed for a TikTok ban on state-owned devices.

Carter is a member of the Gulf Coast Chamber, Mississippi Gulf Coast Association of Realtors, Ducks Unlimited, the National Rifle Association, Coastal Conservation Association, Gulf Coast Carnival Association, and the Revelers Carnival Association.

Family 
He has two sons, Joel Carter III and Garrett Carter. As well as his daughters, Georgia Carter and Sophia Carter.

Controversies 
In February 2023, shortly after the Chinese government balloon incident, Carter was criticized for his racism after he posted a photo online of a balloon with words written on it that mock a stereotypical accent of Chinese American and Asian American people.

References

1978 births
Living people
Republican Party Mississippi state senators
Politicians from Jackson, Mississippi
21st-century American politicians